The Marseilles moraine is a terminal moraine that encircles the southern tip of Lake Michigan in North America. It formed during the Wisconsin glaciation. The glacier had been in retreat when it stopped for an extended period, depositing glacial till and sand creating the hills of the moraine.

Distribution
The Marseilles moraine was preceded by the Bloomington morainic system. The name is taken from the village of Marseilles, located where the Illinois River cuts through the moraine. For south it combined with a till ridge called the Minooka Ridge. This follows the east side of Fox River, past St. Charles, Geneva, Batavia, and Aurora. The east side of each city occupies the outer face of the moraine. The moraine continues south along the line of Will and Kendall counties. The Marseilles moraine turns west, at the bluff between Oswego and Yorkville. The Minooka Ridge continues southward to the Illinois River. The width in Kendall County is only 2 or 3 miles, but increases to 5 or 6 miles in northeastern LaSalle County, near the north bluff of the Illinois River.
At the Illinois Valley, it changes from south-southwest to a south-southeast course. It is associated with Farm Ridge, in Livingston County. The Farm Ridge is an inner ridge of the Bloomington system. Reaching the vicinity of Ste. Anne where it turns southeast.

Iroquois moraine (continuation)
From Ste. Anne, it continues to the southeast, reaching the state line. Here the name changes to the Iroquois. Continuing through Newton  and Jasper counties, Indiana. To the east, it disappears. It may end here, or its remnants may be obscured beneath the Lake Kankakee sand ridges.
In eastern Jasper it turns northward.
Some uncertainty remains on whether it continues to the east. One possible correlative is a moraine, which begins near Bass Lake, in Starke County. Between eastern Jasper County and Bass Lake, the area is generally sand covered, with a broad low ridge running from the north end of the Iroquois moraine at San Pierre to North Judson. This ridge has patches of boulders in the till line from North Judson to Bass Lake, as do many other moraines in northern Indiana. The moraine from Bass Lake runs to the southeast and was formed by the Saginaw lobe, of the Laruentide glacier and is the outer border of the great Maxinkuckee moraine.

Altitude & Topography
The outer border of the moraine follows closely along the  contour line along its border.
The Marseilles moraine has a well-defined crest, which acts as a watershed divide. North of the Illinois River it lies between the Fox River and the Dupage River, Au Sable Creek, and Nettle Creek. South of Illinois lies between the Vermilion Rivers tributaries and the Kankakee River. A branch of it that runs north of the Iroquois River and south of Kankakee River is split by the Iroquois River at several places. The majority of the crest is a series of swells seldom exceeding with easy slopes. Another prominent set of knolls are along the Kankakee and Iroqouis counties. Here the knolls reach  or more above the surrounding moraine.

Outwash
Along Fox River, in Kane and Kendall counties, a belt of coarse gravel lines the outside of the Marseilles moraine. The deposit lay mostly across the river from the moraine. At Batavia it is chiefly on the west side, at Aurora on the east side, and at Yorkville on the west side. The gravel is so extensive in Kane and Kendal counties and so small farther down Fox River as to suggest that it forms a delta.  
In the vicinity of the Illinois River, there are indications of a lake-like expansion of outflowing waters. The Illinois Valley, therefore, appears to have been unopened along the section between the Marseilles moraine and the inner moraine of the Bloomington series.
The basin now drained by the Iroquois River into the Kankakee was blocked by ice in that direction. The outlet would have been west across the rim of the basin in northern Ford County into the east fork of Vermilion River. Evidence of fine sand and silt covering the till plain show that a Lake Watseka occupied this part of the Iroquois valley.

See also 
 Terminal moraine
 Geography of Indiana
 List of glacial moraines
Glacial features, north to south from Lake Michigan:
 Calumet Shoreline
 Glenwood Shoreline
 Tinley Moraine
 Valparaiso Moraine
 Kankakee Outwash Plain

References

 The Illinois Ice Lobe; Frank Leverett; U.S. Geological Survey, Monograph, #38; Government Printing Office; Washington, D.C.; 1899, pg 290-316
 The Pleistocene of Indiana and Michigan, History of the Great Lakes; Marseilles Morainic System, Course and Correlation; Monographs of the United States Geological Survey, Vol LIII; Frank Leverett and Frank B. Taylor; Washington, D.C,; Government Printing Office; 1915

Moraines of Indiana
Geological history of the Great Lakes
Geology of Illinois
Landforms of Illinois
Landforms of Kankakee County, Illinois
Landforms of Iroquois County, Illinois
Landforms of Kane County, Illinois
Landforms of DuPage County, Illinois
Landforms of Newton County, Indiana
Landforms of Jasper County, Indiana
Landforms of Pulaski County, Indiana
Moraines of the United States